Molla Jalal Uddin (born 1946) is a Bangladesh Awami League politician and the former Member of Parliament of Khulna-4.

Career
Uddin was elected to parliament from Khulna-4 as a Bangladesh Awami League candidate in 2008.

References

Awami League politicians
1946 births
Living people
9th Jatiya Sangsad members